Bertil Holmlund (born 5 February 1947) is a Swedish economist, currently Professor of Economics at Uppsala University. He was a member of the prize committee for the Nobel Memorial Prize in Economic Sciences from 1998 to 2001 and from 2005 to 2006 and is the chairman of the committee since 2008.

Holmlund is a member of the Royal Swedish Academy of Sciences since 2004.

References 

1946 births
Labor economists
Living people
Swedish economists
Umeå University alumni
Academic staff of Uppsala University
Members of the Royal Swedish Academy of Sciences